Thomas Gilligan may refer to:

Thomas W. Gilligan, director of the Hoover Institution on War, Revolution and Peace at Stanford University
Lieutenant Thomas Gilligan, American police officer whose shooting of James Powell instigated the Harlem riot of 1964  
Tom Gilligan (footballer, born 1874) (1874–1957), Australian rules footballer for South Melbourne
Tom Gilligan (footballer, born 1978), Australian rules footballer for Adelaide